Kentucky Route 1297 (KY 1297) is a  east–west state highway that traverses two counties in south-central Kentucky.

Route description
KY 1297 is one out of two old, original routes from Bowling Green directly to Glasgow, the other being the current U.S. Route 68 (US 68) and KY 80 alignment east of Bowling Green.

KY 1297 starts at an intersection with KY 1402 east of Bowling Green. The road in its entire route from KY 1402 to the Barren County line is known as Gott–Hydro Road. KY 1297's first major intersection is a crossroad intersection with KY 101 between Smiths Grove and Meador. This is in the unincorporated community of Kepler. KY 1297 mainly runs through rural areas of east-central Warren County, and then enters Barren County, where it is known as Old Bowling Green Road. KY 1297's first intersection in Barren County is a crossroads intersection with KY 255, a road that goes from Mammoth Cave National Park to the north side of the Barren River Lake area. KY 1297 goes through more farmland areas in western Barren County. KY 1297 then goes under an overpass carrying the Cumberland Parkway. KY 1297 reaches its end with an intersection with US 31E (L. Roger Wells Boulevard) on the southwestern side of Glasgow.

History
In June 2014, KY 1297 gained a new intersection with a new extension of the Veterans Outer Loop just west of the Glasgow city limits. The new extension of the Veterans Outer Loop includes an at-grade intersection with KY 1297. The state highway designation for the new section of the Veterans Outer Loop is Kentucky Route 3800.

Major intersections

References

External links
 Kentucky Transportation Cabinet

1297
1297
1297